Kingdom Brass is a brass band based in Kelty, in Fife, Scotland.

Kingdom Brass is graded in the Championship Section, and performs at various concerts, festivals and competitions all over the UK and abroad. It was formed in 1999 by the amalgamation of the Cowdenbeath and Kelty & Blairadam Bands.

The band consists of 35 brass and percussion players.

Rehearsal and Contact Details

Rehearsal Venue 

Kingdom Brass rehearse in the Kingdom Brass Bandroom, Cocklaw Street, Kelty.

Rehearsal Times
Kingdom Brass rehearses on Thursday and Sunday evenings, from 7.30 – 9.30pm.

History
Kingdom Brass was formed in August 1999 after the amalgamation of the Cowdenbeath and the Kelty & Blairadam Bands. What seemed like a sudden decision by many was actually the end process of 18 months of careful planning and negotiation, which started in the spring of 1998. Individuals in both camps saw the potential to form one band with the cream of players in Fife which would be capable of challenging for the top honours.

A meeting between the two band committees was organised, and this took place in the Warout Stadium in Glenrothes in the summer of 1999. The proposals were discussed and the majority voted for the amalgamation. Both bands were then advised of the decision, which was positively welcomed by the majority of players.

The final competition between the two bands was the Scottish Miners Gala, which saw the rivalry of past years put aside with players from both bands guesting with the other in an almost party atmosphere. Cowdenbeath won the event, Kelty were runners up, and with that the new band was born.

Kingdom competed for the first time at the Fife Championships of 1999, and easily swept the boards at that event. In the years since then the band has gone on to win countless trophy after trophy, and is now firmly established as one of Scotland's top bands. Kingdom has been awarded the title of Scottish Band of the year 2000 and 2001, and won the Forth Valley competition in 2001 after being runners up in that event in 1999 and 2000. A highlight for the band was competing at the National Finals in the Royal Albert Hall in 2000.

In 2008 Kingdom finally broke into the top 3 at the Scottish Championships, the best result by a Fife band in 30 years. That result was repeated in 2012, continuing Kingdom's consistent run of Scottish Championship results.

The band won the Carnegie Invitation Contest in 2005, retaining the title in 2007, 2008, 2010, 2011, 2012, 2013 and 2018. Kingdom also won the Land O'Burns contest in 2011 (and were runners up in 2012), the Northern Counties title in 2017 and 2018 and the Scottish Challenge Shield in 2018. 

Kingdom has also found success at a National Level, winning the 2006 Senior Trophy competition and gaining third place at the 2009 Senior Cup. In 2014 Kingdom were runners up at the Senior Cup, gaining promotion to the Grand Shield for 2015. In 2021 Kingdom Brass won the National Championships of Great Britain (1st Section) title, conducted by Ian Porthouse.

The band can boast some of the finest solo players in Scotland, and produced the Scottish Solo champion in 2000 (cornet player Lee Bathgate), 2001 (tuba player Gareth Ross) and 2008 (when cornet player James Smith lifted his eighth Scottish Title). The band's trombone quartet has been runners up at the Scottish Championships in 2000 and 2001, while Kingdom's mixed quartet became Scottish Champions in 2001, a title they retained in 2007 and again in 2008.

The success of the band in the initial years enabled Kingdom to move on to a higher stage competition wise. The band was invited to compete at the European Open Brass Band Championships in 2002, which was held in the impressive 'Kultur und Kongresszentrum' in Lucerne, Switzerland. That trip proved to be the highlight of the band's first few years, with a creditable sixth placing and an invite back to the event for 2003 where the band gained seventh place. In 2011 Kingdom Brass represented Scotland at the European Brass Band Championships, which were held in Montreux, Switzerland.

Kingdom was approached early in 2004 by Bob Ross, conductor of the renowned brass ensemble 'Blechschaden' (which is made up of members of the brass section of the Munich Philharmonic) to appear alongside them in a TV documentary while they toured Scotland in May 2004. The success of this documentary (which has been seen by many millions throughout Europe) led to a partnership being formed, with an invite extended to Kingdom to perform a series of concerts in Germany. In April 2006 Kingdom Brass embarked on a week long tour of Germany, performing sell out concerts from Hamburg in the north to Munich in the south. Kingdom again appeared alongside Bob on German TV in 2008 when filming took place during one of the band's Christmas concerts in December 2007.

In 2019 Kingdom completed a Community Asset Transfer to take ownership of the old library building in Kelty. After extensive refurbishment the band moved into the new hall, rehearsing there for the first time on 19 December 2019.

'B' Band 
The Kingdom Brass 'B' Band was first proposed in 2007 as part of the band's 5-year development plan, covering the period from 2007 – 2012.

During 2011 a planning and recruitment phase took place, and the 'B' Band was officially registered with SBBA on 22 August 2011. The first rehearsal of Kingdom Brass 'B' was on Wednesday 12 October 2011.

The band made their contesting debut at the Scottish Championships in Glenrothes on 10 March 2012, conducted by Bede Williams, and won the 4th section. Kingdom 'B' then contested at the Carnegie competition in April 2012, winning the 4th section title. In April 2013 the band added the 3rd section title at the Carnegie to their impressive contesting record.

On 22 September 2012, Kingdom Brass 'B' competed in their third competition, the National Brass Band Championships of Great Britain, at 'The Centaur', Cheltenham. They were conducted at the contest by Andrew Duncan and finished in 7th place.

On 6 October 2012, Kingdom Brass 'B' competed at their first FCBA Championships, winning the 4th section contest as well as the title of 'Best Fife 'B' Band'.

On 2 December 2012, Kingdom Brass 'B' won the Scottish Challenge Cup, in Perth Concert Hall, conducted by Ken Blackwood. That victory rounded off a clean sweep of all the 4th Section titles in 2012, and meant the band took the title of 'Scottish 4th Section Band of the Year'.

On 9 March 2013, Kingdom Brass 'B' competed in Section 3 at the Scottish Championships in Perth, finishing in 2nd place.

Kingdom Brass Youth Initiative
The Kingdom Brass Youth Initiative (KBYI) was proposed in February 2007 following the very poor turn out in the youth sections at the Fife Charities Band Association (FCBA) solo & ensemble contest.

An initial meeting was held between members of Kingdom Brass and Alan Edmond, the Youth Development Officer for the Scottish Brass Band Association (SBBA). This meeting led to the formation of a 5-year youth development plan for Kingdom Brass, and the formation of the KBYI.

Initial funding was received in September 2007 from the National Lottery Awards for All scheme.

In November 2007 the first workshops were held in local primary schools, and tuition began in December 2007.

The first concert appearance of Kingdom Brass Youth was in August 2008, alongside Kingdom Brass at the Aberdour Festival.

The first competition appearance of Kingdom Brass Youth was in August 2008, at Brass in the Park in Newtongrange.

In September 2008, Kingdom Brass was awarded a Youth Music Initiative Large Grant from the Scottish Arts Council. This investment allowed a professional tutor and conductor to be employed on a part-time basis by the organisation to oversee the development of the members and tutors.

The Scottish Arts Council awarded Kingdom Brass a YMI Small Grant in September 2009 to launch the Kingdom Brass Percussion Academy, to teach percussion alongside brass.

In September 2010 the Kingdom Brass Youth Band won their first ever contest, with victory in the Novice Section at Brass in the Park.

In July 2011 funding was received from Fife Council and the Coalfields Regeneration Trust to allow the Percussion Academy to purchase new equipment and grow in size, with up to 20 young percussionists receiving lessons on a wide range of percussion instruments.

Creative Scotland awarded the KBYI another Youth Music Initiative Large Grant in August 2011. This award was part of a wider project to expand the organisation's youth setup from 2011 to 2013.

On 17 November 2013 the Kingdom Percussion Academy, led by Head Tutor Lynsey Paterson, won the Percussion Section at the Scottish Youth Championships in Perth Concert Hall.

Honours

Kingdom Brass 

National Finals (1st Section) Winners - 2021

British Open (Senior Cup) Runners-up – 2014
British Open (Senior Cup) 3rd Place – 2009
British Open (Senior Trophy) Winners – 2006

Scottish Challenge Shield winners - 2018, 2021

FCBA Champions – 1999, 2000, 2001, 2002, 2003, 2004, 2005, 2006, 2008, 2009, 2010, 2011, 2012, 2013, 2014, 2015, 2017, 2018, 2019, 2022

Scottish Band of the Year – 2000, 2001, 2018, 2019

Northern Counties Champions - 2017, 2018

Forth Valley Champions – 2001

Land O'Burns Champions – 2011

Carnegie Champions – 2005, 2007, 2008, 2010, 2011, 2012, 2013, 2018

Scottish Championships (Championship Section) 3rd Place – 2008, 2012

Scottish Championships (1st Section) Winners - 2020
Scottish Championships (1st Section) Runners up – 2000
Scottish Championships (1st Section) 3rd Place - 2019

Scottish Solo Champions – 2000 (Lee Bathgate), 2001 (Gareth Ross), 2008 (James Smith)

Scottish Ensemble Champions – 2001, 2007, 2008

Kingdom Brass 'B' 

Scottish Championships (4th Section) Winners – 2012
Scottish Championships (3rd Section) Runners up – 2013

Scottish Challenge Cup Winners – 2012

FCBA Champions (4th Section) – 2012

Best Fife 'B' Band – 2012

Carnegie Champions (4th Section) – 2012
Carnegie Champions (3rd Section) – 2013

Scottish 4th Section Band of the Year – 2012

Kingdom Brass Youth 

Brass in the Park (Novice Section) Champions – 2010

Kingdom Percussion Academy 

Scottish Youth Championships (Percussion Section) Champions – 2013

Cowdenbeath

FCBA Champions – 1972, 1973, 1974, 1975, 1977, 1984, 1985, 1986, 1988, 1989, 1990, 1991, 1992, 1993, 1994, 1995, 1996, 1997

Scottish Band of the Year – 1971, 1973, 1974, 1975, 1987, 1988, 1989, 1990

National Finals (1st Section) Runners-up - 1998

National Finals (2nd Section) 3rd Place - 1987

CISWO Mineworkers National Champions (2nd Section) Winners - 1995
CISWO Mineworkers National Champions (2nd Section) Runners-up - 1985
CISWO Mineworkers National Champions (2nd Section) 3rd Place - 1996

CISWO Mineworkers National Champions (3rd Section) Winners - 1964
CISWO Mineworkers National Champions (3rd Section) Runners-up - 1963

Scottish Miners Gala Champions – 1958, 1972, 1978, 1979, 1986, 1988, 1993, 1994, 1997, 1999

Northern Counties Champions – 1987, 1988, 1990, 1991, 1997, 1998

Strathclyde Charities Champions – 1990

Scottish Championships (Championship Section) Runners-up – 1909, 1912, 1917
Scottish Championships (Championship Section) 3rd Place – 1973

Scottish Championships (1st Section) Winners – 1998

Scottish Championships (2nd Section) Winners – 1908, 1968, 1971, 1996
Scottish Championships (2nd Section) Runners-up – 1926, 1937, 1949, 1987
Scottish Championships (2nd Section) 3rd Place – 1955

Scottish Championships (3rd Section) Runners-up – 1948, 1967
Scottish Championships (3rd Section) 3rd Place – 1947, 1965

Scottish Championships (4th Section) Winners – 1962
Scottish Championships (4th Section) 3rd Place – 1961

Kelty & Blairadam

FCBA Champions – 1998

National Finals (4th Section) 3rd Place - 1990

CISWO Mineworkers National Champions (1st Section) 2nd Place - 1997

CISWO Mineworkers National Champions (2nd Section) 2nd Place - 1992

CISWO Mineworkers National Champions (3rd Section) Winners - 1991
CISWO Mineworkers National Champions (3rd Section) 3rd Place - 1978

CISWO Mineworkers National Champions (4th Section) 2nd Place - 1990

Scottish Championships (Championship Section) Winners – 1906, 1908
Scottish Championships (Championship Section) Runners-up – 1910, 1911
Scottish Championships (Championship Section) 3rd Place – 1928

Scottish Championships (1st Section) Runners-up – 1993
Scottish Championships (1st Section) 3rd Place – 1998, 1999

Scottish Championships (2nd Section) Winners – 1895, 1992
Scottish Championships (2nd Section) Runners-up – 1951
Scottish Championships (2nd Section) 3rd Place – 1947, 1959

Scottish Championships (3rd Section) Winners – 1991
Scottish Championships (3rd Section) 3rd Place – 1969, 1970, 1971, 1972, 1973, 1978, 1979

Scottish Championships (4th Section) Winners – 1990
Scottish Championships (4th Section) Runners-up – 1968, 1977

Television, Radio and CD Recordings

Television Appearances 

In May 2004 Kingdom Brass were invited by Bob Ross, conductor of the German brass group Blechschaden, to appear on a television documentary featuring the brass group touring Scotland. The documentary was watched by several million people across Germany and other parts of central Europe. Following the showing of the documentary, Bob Ross received several calls asking who the brass band were, and when would they be appearing in Germany. Because of the success of the television documentary, Kingdom Brass were invited to tour Germany in May 2006.

In December 2007, Bob Ross visited Scotland again, and was filmed alongside Kingdom Brass in one of the band's Christmas concerts, which was screened throughout Germany in 2008.

Before the formation of Kingdom Brass, several members of the Cowdenbeath Band appeared twice on Songs of Praise.

Radio Broadcasts
In August 2007, BBC Radio Scotland broadcast Sunday Bandstand, a programme featuring recordings from the West Lothian Festival of Brass which included a live performance from Kingdom Brass.

Before the band's appearance at the European Open Brass Band Championships in 2002, a preview of the competition on local radio in Switzerland featured several pieces from one of the band's CD recordings.

During the 1970s Cowdenbeath appeared regularly on the radio competition, Bandstand.

CD Recordings
Kingdom's first CD recording was Les Preludes in 2000. The recording featured cornet player Graeme McCulloch as guest soloist.

In 2006, to coincide with the band's tour of Germany, Kingdom Brass released The Flying Scot. This CD featured pieces recorded over two studio sessions, with Archie Hutchison conducting the first session, and Craig Anderson the second. This recording was a great commercial success for the band, selling several hundred copies on the tour.

In March 2011 Kingdom Brass recorded alongside Simon Johnson, principal trombone of the BBC Scottish Symphony Orchestra, on his solo CD. The recording was released in November 2011.

Conductors

Musical Director 

The current Musical Director of Kingdom Brass is Paul Drury. Paul took over that post with Kingdom Brass in January 2016.

The current Professional Conductor of Kingdom Brass is Ian Porthouse. Ian took on that role with Kingdom in September 2017.

Previous Conductors 
Over the past few years Kingdom has worked very successfully at a variety of events with various professional conductors, including Thomas Wyss, Alan Morrison, David Hirst, Ray Farr, Graham O'Connor, James Gourlay, Frans Violet and Luc Vertommen.

The band have also employed several local conductors to act as Musical Director since 1999, including Bruce Fraser, Gavin Lindsay, Simon Kerwin, Iain Davey, Craig Anderson, Andrew Duncan, Bede Williams and Eoin Tonner.

Personnel

The current personnel of Kingdom Brass are:

Affiliations
Kingdom Brass is affiliated locally to the Fife Charities Band Association and nationally to the Scottish Brass Band Association.

References

External links
 Kingdom Brass Website
 FCBA Website
 SBBA Website

British brass bands
Culture in Fife
Scottish musical groups
Organisations based in Fife